Abdul Khaliq Hazara may refer to:

Abdul Khaliq Hazara (assassin) (1916-1933), assassinated King Nadir Khan of Afghanistan on 8 November 1933
Abdul Khaliq Hazara (politician), ethnic Hazara politician in Balochistan, Pakistan - active late 20th and early 21st century